Barry Hoban (born 5 February 1940) is a former English professional cyclist who rode during the late 1960s and early 1970s. He formerly held the record for the most stage wins in the Tour de France by a British rider, winning eight between 1967 and 1975. He holds the record (now shared with David Millar) for the most Tours completed by a British rider – having finished 11 of the 12 he started between 1965 and 1978. He was also the first Briton to win two consecutive stages of the Tour (a feat matched by Mark Cavendish in 2008, twice in 2009 and once in 2010, and by Geraint Thomas in 2018).

Early career
Hoban started cycle racing in 1955, joining Calder Clarion, and by the end of the year was competing against Tom Simpson in individual time trials. Two years later, he was fourth in the British League of Racing Cyclists hill-climb (the senior title being won by Simpson). Despite his early prowess as a climber, Hoban later established himself as one of Europe's best sprinters.

Inspired by the European successes of fellow Yorkshireman Brian Robinson and of Simpson, Hoban went to France in 1962, turned professional two years later, and stayed abroad for another 16 years. He rode for Mercier-Hutchinson-BP where his team leader was Raymond Poulidor who is famous for coming second three times in the Tour de France but never winning. Hoban was single then and used to come back to Wakefield for the winter with a case full of used shorts/jerseys etc. and sell them to the local riders (it wasn't easy then to get good quality kit and what was available was expensive). Dozens of riders in the BCF West Yorks division had a pair of shorts with Mercier Hutchinson embroidered on the legs. Back then, the best frames were hand-built British ones and Maurice Woodrup, a Leeds frame builder, would have a new frame sprayed Mercier pink waiting for him each year. He would take it back to have Mercier transfers attached.

In the 1967 Tour de France, after the death of Tom Simpson, Hoban won the next stage. Two years later, in 1969, Hoban married Simpson's widow, with whom he has a daughter Daniella, and two stepdaughters Jane and Joanne.

Major Results 

1963 
 10th Overall Paris–Luxembourg
1964
 Vuelta a España
1st Stages 12 & 13 
 1st Stage 3 Grand Prix du Midi Libre
 2nd Circuit des Frontières
 9th Genoa–Nice
1966 
 1st Eschborn–Frankfurt
 1st Stage 2a Tour de l'Oise
 5th Overall Four Days of Dunkirk
1967
 1st Stage 14 Tour de France
 2nd Paris–Tours
 5th Tour of Flanders
 7th Dwars door België
1968
 1st Stage 19 Tour de France 
 2nd Overall Tour de l'Oise
 2nd Grand Prix de Denain
 9th GP Fayt-le-Franc
 10th Liège–Bastogne–Liège
1969 
 Tour de France 
1st Stages 18 & 19 
 1st Stage 1b Four Days of Dunkirk
 3rd Liège–Bastogne–Liège
 7th Tour of Flanders
 9th Harelbeke–Antwerp–Harelbeke
 9th Ronde van Limburg
1970
 1st Manx Trophy
 2nd Circuit des Frontières
 5th Grand Prix de Fourmies
 6th Bordeaux–Paris
 7th Overall Four Days of Dunkirk
1st Stage 3 
 7th De Kustpijl
1971 
 1st Grand Prix de Fourmies
 1st Stage 5b Four Days of Dunkirk
 2nd Overall Tour de l'Oise
 6th Kuurne–Brussels–Kuurne
 10th Overall Tour de Luxembourg
1972 
 3rd Overall Tour de Luxembourg
 3rd Paris–Roubaix
 8th Paris–Bourges
 9th Paris–Tours
 9th Kuurne–Brussels–Kuurne
1973 
 Tour de France
1st Stages 11 & 19 
 10th Overall Setmana Catalana de Ciclisme
1974 
 1st  Overall Grand Prix du Midi Libre
1st Stages 1b & 3 
 1st Gent–Wevelgem
 1st Paris–Bourges
 1st Stage 13 Tour de France
 2nd Overall Tour de l'Aude
1st Stage 3
 4th Züri-Metzgete
 10th Overall Four Days of Dunkirk
1975
 1st Stage 8 Tour de France 
 10th Overall Four Days of Dunkirk
1978
 2nd Grand Prix Pino Cerami
 5th Overall Four Days of Dunkirk
1st Stage 5b 
 10th Overall Tour de l'Oise
1980
 8th Nokere Koerse

Tour de France Stage Wins
1967 - Stage 14 - Carpentras – Sète – Hoban was allowed to win after the death of Tom Simpson on the previous stage.
1968 - Stage 19 - Grenoble – Sallanches – a rarity in that Hoban won a mountain stage, not a sprint.
1969 - Stage 18 - Mourenx – Bordeaux
1969 - Stage 19 - Bordeaux - Brive-la-Gaillarde – the first Briton to win successive stages of the Tour.
1973 – Stage 11 - Montpellier - Argelès-sur-Mer
1973 - Stage 19 - Bourges – Versaille
1974 - Stage 13 - Avignon – Montpellier
1975 - Stage 8 - Angoulême - Bordeaux

Other career highlights
He competed in the team pursuit at the 1960 Summer Olympics.

Hoban also won two stages of the 1964 Vuelta a España and the 1974 Gent–Wevelgem,  where he finished ahead of Eddy Merckx and Roger De Vlaeminck. In the ’Monument’ Classics, his best performances were third places in Liège–Bastogne–Liège (1969) and Paris–Roubaix (1972). Towards the end of a career spent largely in mainland Europe, Hoban occasionally returned to the UK to race; he won the London-Bradford race and was second in the British professional road-race championship in 1979, and he won the Grand Prix of Manchester in 1980.

At least one bicycle was made with his name on it, including Barry Hoban-badged frames made by Coventry Cycles (later trading as Coventry Eagle). This is a common practice of retired racing cyclists. Hoban lives in Mid-Wales after moving there to work with the factory that built his frames.

In 2009 he was inducted into the British Cycling Hall of Fame.

References

Further reading
 
  Hoban, Barry; Vas-y-Barry. 2015. Cycling Legends www.cyclinglegends.co.uk

External links 

Official Tour de France results for Barry Hoban

1940 births
Living people
Sportspeople from Wakefield
Cyclists from Yorkshire
British Tour de France stage winners
British Vuelta a España stage winners
Olympic cyclists of Great Britain
Cyclists at the 1960 Summer Olympics